Kargah Buddha is an archaeological site located about  outside of Gilgit, Gilgit−Baltistan, Pakistan. The carving, which is in a style also found in Baltistan, is estimated to date back to the 7th century.

The image is surrounded by the holes for a wooden house structure, which would have sheltered it from inclement weather.

Location and history
Nearby locales include Barmas, Napur, and the Rakaposhi mountain.

From the 3rd century to the 11th century, Gilgit was a prominent centre of early Buddhism. During this time period, multiple powers vied for control of the region, including the Tibetan Empire, the Kashmiri Karkota Dynasty, and the Umayyad and Abbasid caliphates. By the 11th century, Gilgit had grown into the autonomous kingdom of Dardistan before largely adopting Islam.

Carving excavation and legends
It is estimated that the carving was completed in the 7th century. It was discovered in 1938–39, following the innovation of supposed Gilgit manuscripts in 1931.

According to local legend, the figure is actually a man-eating giantess or witch (yakhshini or ya-chaani or yacheni) who terrorized the local residents and was ultimately pinned to the cliff by a pir (holy man) as punishment.

References

7th-century works
1938 archaeological discoveries
Archaeological sites in Gilgit-Baltistan
Gautama Buddha in art
History of Gilgit-Baltistan
Monuments and memorials in Gilgit-Baltistan
Buildings and structures in Gilgit-Baltistan
Rock reliefs